The 2005 Twenty20 Cup was the third Twenty20 Cup competition for English and Welsh county clubs. The finals day took place on 30 July at The Oval, and was won by the Somerset Sabres.

Fixtures and results

Group stage

Midlands/Wales/West Division

North Division

South Division

Quarter-finals

Finals Day

Semi-finals

Final

See also
Twenty20 Cup

References

External links
 Tournament site on ESPN CricInfo

Twenty20 Cup
Twenty20 Cup